The uMhlabuyalingana Local Municipality council consists of thirty-five members elected by mixed-member proportional representation. Eighteen councillors are elected by first-past-the-post voting in eighteen wards, while the remaining seventeen are chosen from party lists so that the total number of party representatives is proportional to the number of votes received. In the election of 3 August 2016 the African National Congress (ANC) won a majority of twenty-two seats on the council.

Results 
The following table shows the composition of the council after past elections.

December 2000 election

The following table shows the results of the 2000 election.

March 2006 election

The following table shows the results of the 2006 election.

May 2011 election

The following table shows the results of the 2011 election.

August 2016 election

The following table shows the results of the 2016 election.

August 2016 to November 2021 by-elections
Following a by election which took place in March 2019 the ANC won a ward previously held by the IFP, and the council was reconstituted as follows:

November 2021 election

The following table shows the results of the 2021 election.

References

uMhlabuyalingana
Elections in KwaZulu-Natal
Umkhanyakude District Municipality